Guentherus is a genus of jellynose fishes, belonging to the Ateleopodidae family, with two recognized species:
 Guentherus altivela Osório, 1917 (jellynose, highfin tadpole fish)
 Guentherus katoi Senou, Kuwayama & Hirate, 2008

The genus distinguishes itself from others in its family because of discrepancies in morphology. Guentherus has "3 free rays followed by 6–9 normal rays with membrane between them in the pelvic fins." Other genera in this family have "a single long filament or 1 relatively developed ray plus 0 to 3 rudimentary rays."

 |thumb|

Family: Ateleopodidae 
The family Ateleopodidae is made up of four genera and within that thirteen species: Ateleopus, Ijimaia, Parateleopus, Guentherus. Ateleopodids are located primarily near tropical and subtropical waters; with Ateleopus, Parateleopus, and Guentherus located in the Pacific and  Ijimaia located in the Atlantic. 
Ateleopodids are commonly referred to as Jellynose fish or alternatively also called tadpole fish "because of their very soft and gelatinous snout."

Genus: Guentherus 
The genus Guentherus was created by Balthazar Osorio in 1917 upon his discovery of the Guentherus ativela species. The genus Guentherus differentiates from its other Ateleopodids because of their "posterior placement and structure of  its pelvic fins-three free rays followed by  a normal pelvic fin." They are a benthically dwelling ray-finned fish. Guentherus Ativela is known to feed on copepods and polychaetas.

Species: Guentherus Katoi

Distribution 
Guentherus Katoi was named after Mr. Tatsuya Kato who was the one to capture it. G. Katoi has been found at depths of 1,000-2,000 feet. The onlAteleopus japonicus.jpgy specimens of G. katoi have been found off the coast of Southern Japan down to the outlying southern Okinawa Islands.

Physical Description 
They are a scaleless Actinopterygii species with jaws though lacking teeth.
 “Head and body pale pink, covered with many reddish to dark brown spots on nape to the lateral side of body.”
 “Dorsal fin reddish brown in lower half, blackish distally; some small dark brown spots on the basal part of dorsal fin.”
 “Pectoral fins reddish brown, blackish distally, and grayish in the lower part. Pelvic fins blackish except for 3 white, free rays.”

Defining Characteristics 
It can be distinguished from other species in its genus because of its lack of lateral line and scales.

Bibliography 

 Bussing, W., & Lopez, M. (1977). View of Guentherus altivela OSORIO, the first 

ateleopodid fish reported from the eastern Pacific Ocean. Revista De Biologia Tropical, 25, (2) 179-190. Retrieved from https://revistas.ucr.ac.cr/index.php/rbt/article/view/25828/26188

 Froese, Rainer, Daniels, & Pauly (Eds.). (2012, February). Guentherus Species. Retrieved 6 April 2021, from https://www.fishbase.de/identification/SpeciesList.php?genus=Guentherus

 Gerringer, M. E., Drazen J. C., Linley, T. D., Summers, A. P., Jamieson, A. J., & Yancey, 

P. H. (2017). Distribution, composition and functions of gelatinous tissues in deep-sea fishes.  Royal Society, 4, (12): 171063.  

 Hollingworth, C. (27 April 2005). The living marine resources of the western CENTRAL Atlantic. Volume 1: Introduction, molluscs, crustaceans, hagfishes, sharks, BATOID fishes, And chimaeras. Volume 2: Bony fishes Part 1 (Acipenseridae To Grammatidae). VOLUME 3: Bony fishes Part 2 (opistognathidae to Molidae), sea turtles and marine mammals. FAO species identification guide for fishery purposes and American Society of ICHTHYOLOGISTS and HERPETOLOGISTS Special Publication No. 5.  
Macpherson, E. (1989). Influence of geographical distribution, body size and diet on population density of benthic fishes off Namibia (South West Africa). Influence of geographical distribution, body size and diet on population density of benthic fishes off Namibia (South West Africa)

 Prokofiev, A. M. (2006) New finding of ateleopus purpureus tanaka, 1915 (Ateleopodiformes: 

Ateleopodidae) in the Pacific waters of Japan. Journal of  Ichthyology, 46, 342-344.  

 Senou, H., Kuwayama, S., & Hirate, K. (2008). A new species of the genus Guentherus 

(Ateleopodiformes: Ateleopodidae) from Japan. Bulletin of the National Museum of Nature and Science, 2, 13-19. Retrieved from https://www.kahaku.go.jp/research/publication/zoology/s2/S_02Senou_et_al.pdf

 Schroeder, R., Schwarz, R., & Schwingel, P. (2011). The occurrence of the jellynose 

fish Ijimaia antillarum in the south-western Atlantic. Marine Biodiversity Records, 4,

References

Ateleopodiformes